Sir Arthur South (29 October 1914 – 28 January 2003) was a prominent Norfolk politician and administrator in the 1970s.

Having been Norwich City Council's youngest councillor, South led the Council for 18 years and was Lord Mayor of Norwich for 1956-7.

He will be "remembered by football fans as a forthright chairman and high-profile ambassador of Norwich City Football Club (1973-1985)." It was in recognition of this that South was made an inaugural inductee of the Norwich City Hall of Fame. The South Stand at Carrow Road is named in South's honour. The Sir Arthur South Lounge, located within the Norwich and Peterborough stand of Carrow Road is also named in his honour.

His name lives on at the Norfolk and Norwich University Hospital where the operating theatre complex for day surgery is named the Arthur South Day Procedure Unit.

References

1914 births
2003 deaths
People associated with the University of East Anglia
Norwich City F.C.
Politicians from Norwich
Mayors of Norwich